This is a list of the winners of the Bavarian Film Awards Prize for best production.

1982 Franz Seitz, Michael Wiedemann
1983 Karel Dirka
1984 Bernd Eichinger, Günter Rohrbach
1986 Bernd Eichinger
1987 Werner Herzog, Lucki Stipetic
1988 Christian Wagner
1989 Moritz Bormann, Wolf Gaudlitz, Rainer Söhnlein
1990 Steffen and Thomas Kuchenreuther, Joseph Vilsmaier
1991 Eberhard Junkersdorf
1992 Bob Arnold, Hanno Huth, Günter Rohrbach, Joseph Vilsmaier
1993 Bernd Eichinger
1994 Clemens Kuby, Peter Zenk
1995 Michael Verhoeven, Joseph Vilsmaier
1996 Jakob Claussen, Luggi Waldleitner, Thomas Wöbke
1997 Eberhard Junkersdorf
1998 Stefan Arndt, Wolfgang Becker, Dani Levy, Tom Tykwer
1999 Rob Houwer, Peter Schamoni, Franz Xaver Gernstl
2000 Kerstin Dobbertin von Fürstenberg, Harald Kügler, Herbert Rimbach
2001 Andreas Bareiß, Gloria Burkert, Peter Herrmann
2002 Karl Blatz, Uschi Reich, Peter Zenk
2003 Jakob Claussen, Uli Putz
2004 Bernd Eichinger
2005 Christoph Müller and Sven Burgemeister, Marc Rothemund and Fred Breinersdorfer
2006 Andreas Richter, Annie Brunner and Ursula Woerner
2007 Harald Kügler and Molly von Fürstenberg

References
https://www.stmd.bayern.de/wp-content/uploads/2020/08/Bayerische-Filmpreisträger-bis-2020.pdf

Bavarian film awards